Eider are large seaducks in the genus Somateria, including:
 Common eider (Somateria mollissima)
 Spectacled eider (Somateria fischeri)
 King eider (Somateria spectabilis)

Eider may also refer to:
 Steller's eider (Polysticta stelleri) of the duck subfamily Merginae
 Eider (river), in Schleswig-Holstein, Germany
 Eider (Amt Kirchspielslandgemeinde), a collective municipality in Dithmarschen, Schleswig-Holstein, Germany
 Eider (brand), Korean company

 Surnames
 Max Eider (born Peter Millson), a guitarist and songwriter
 Rabbi Shimon Eider, a rabbi

 Forenames
 Eider Arévalo (born 1993), Colombian racewalker
 Eider Torres, (born 1983), baseball player from Venezuela

Fictional characters
 Eider Duck, a Disney character who is Donald Duck's paternal uncle
 Sir Eider McDuck, a Disney character who is an ancestor of Scrooge McDuck and Donald Duck
 Aunt Eider, a Disney character who is the aunt of both Scrooge McDuck and John D. Rockerduck

Ships
 , a motor schooner in commission in the U.S. Bureau of Fisheries from 1919 to 1940, U.S. Fish and Wildlife Service from 1940 to 1949, and U.S. Geological Survey from 1949 to 1954

See also 
 Eder (disambiguation)